The MIBOR (Mumbai Inter-Bank Offer Rate) is a financial instrument.

The Committee for the Development of the Debt Market that had studied and recommended the modalities for the development for a benchmark rate for the call money market. Accordingly, NSE had developed and launched the NSE Mumbai Inter-bank Bid Rate (MIBID) and NSE Mumbai Inter-bank Offer Rate (MIBOR) for the overnight money market on June 15, 1998. The success of the Overnight NSE MIBID MIBOR encouraged the Exchange to develop a benchmark rate for the term money market. NSE launched the 14-day NSE MIBID MIBOR on November 10, 1998, and the longer term money market benchmark rates for 1 month and 3 months on December 1, 1998. Further, the exchange introduced a 3 Day FIMMDA-NSE MIBID-MIBOR on all Fridays with effect from June 6, 2008, in addition to existing overnight rate.

The MIBID/MIBOR rate is used as a bench mark rate for majority of deals struck for Interest Rate Swaps, Forward Rate Agreements, Floating Rate Debentures and Term Deposits.

Fixed Income Money Market and Derivative Association of India (FIMMDA) has been in the forefront for creation of benchmarks that can be used by the market participants to bring uniformity in the market place. To take the process of development further, FIMMDA and NSEIL have taken the initiative to co-brand the dissemination of reference rates for the Overnight Call and Term Money Market using the current methodology behind NSE – MIBID/MIBOR. The product was rechristened as 'FIMMDA-NSE MIBID/MIBOR'. The 'FIMMDA-NSE MIBID/MIBOR' is now jointly disseminated by FIMMDA as well as NSEIL through their websites and other means and simultaneous dissemination of the information would be as per international practice.

The rate is fixed on the basis of "volume based weighted average of traded rates from 9 to 10 in the morning".

See also 
 Euribor
 TIBOR
 Prime rate
 TED spread
 Libor-OIS spread
 LIBID
 MIBOR (disambiguation)

References

External links
 NSE Wholesale debt market link - https://web.archive.org/web/20061113122251/http://www.nse-india.com/content/debt/debt_statistics.htm
 Today's MIBOR MIBID values - https://web.archive.org/web/20050208173517/http://www.nse-india.com/marketinfo/eod_information/bidbor.jsp

Reference rates